Mitchell Ward is a former American football player who played three seasons in the Arena Football League with the Dallas Texans and Charlotte Rage. He played college football at Southwest Texas State College.

References

External links
Just Sports Stats

Living people
Year of birth missing (living people)
American football fullbacks
American football linebackers
African-American players of American football
Texas State Bobcats football players
Dallas Texans (Arena) players
Charlotte Rage players
21st-century African-American people